The Grand Slam in professional golf is winning all of golf's major championships in the same calendar year. Variations include a Career Grand Slam: winning all of the major tournaments within a player's career and the Tiger Slam: winning four consecutive major titles but not in the same calendar year (named after Tiger Woods, the only player to accomplish the feat).

Men's golf

The Grand Slam in men's golf is an unofficial term for winning all four major championships in the same year.

In the modern era, the Grand Slam requires victories in four tournaments in a single calendar year (listed in current playing order):
 Masters Tournament, held the week ending on the 2nd Sunday in April – hosted as an invitational by and played at Augusta National Golf Club
 PGA Championship (also known as the "United States PGA Championship" or "USPGA"), held the week ending on the 3rd Sunday in May, one week before Memorial Day weekend – hosted by the PGA of America and played at various locations in the United States. Prior to 2019, it was held in mid-August, three weeks before Labor Day weekend.
 U.S. Open, held the week ending on the 3rd Sunday in June – hosted by the USGA and played at various locations in the United States.
 The Open Championship ("The Open", sometimes called "the British Open" outside the UK), held the week containing the 3rd Friday in July – hosted by The R&A and always played on a links course at one of several predetermined locations in the United Kingdom on a rota basis.

Prior to the creation of the Masters Tournament, the national amateur championships of the U.S. and the UK were considered major championships. During that earlier era, the Grand Slam comprised consecutive victories at the United States Amateur Championship, The Amateur Championship (British Amateur) along with the U.S. Open and the Open Championship. 

Only Bobby Jones completed a Grand Slam, in 1930. No man has ever achieved a modern era Grand Slam.

The term Grand Slam was first applied to Bobby Jones' achievement of winning the four major golf events of 1930: The Open Championship, the U.S. Open, the U.S. Amateur and the British Amateur. When Jones won all four, the sports world searched for ways to capture the magnitude of his accomplishment. Up to that time, there was no term for such a feat because no one had thought it possible. The Atlanta Journals O. B. Keeler dubbed it the "Grand Slam," borrowing a bridge term. George Trevor of the New York Sun wrote that Jones had "stormed the impregnable quadrilateral of golf." Keeler would later write the words that would forever be linked to one of the greatest individual accomplishments in the history of sports:

This victory, the fourth major title in the same season and in the space of four months, had now and for all time entrenched Bobby Jones safely within the 'Impregnable Quadrilateral of Golf,' that granite fortress that he alone could take by escalade, and that others may attack in vain, forever.

The modern definition could not be applied until at least 1934, when the Masters was founded, and still carried little weight in 1953 when Ben Hogan won the Masters, U.S. Open, and Open Championship.  That year, it was impossible to win all four as the PGA Championship preceded and overlapped with the Open Championship; the PGA's 36-hole match play semifinals and finals near Detroit were the same days as the mandatory 36-hole qualifier at Carnoustie in Scotland for the Open Championship; the only way to compete in both events was to lose an early match at the PGA. Hogan is the only player to have won the Masters, U.S. Open, and Open Championship in the same calendar year.

In 1960, Arnold Palmer won the Masters in April and U.S. Open in June. According to his autobiography, A Golfer's Life, he and his friend Bob Drum (of the Pittsburgh Press), while on the trans-Atlantic flight to The Open Championship at St Andrews, came up with the idea that adding it and the PGA Championship titles that July would constitute a modern Grand Slam. Drum spread the notion among the gathered media and it caught on. Two years earlier, the PGA had changed to stroke play, and it started to be held two weeks after the Open Championship in 1960. Scheduling problems continued through the 1960s as the last two majors were held in successive weeks in July on five occasions. The PGA was played in August in 1965 but returned to July for the next three. With the formation of the Tournament Players Division in late 1968, now the PGA Tour, the PGA Championship moved to August in 1969 and, except for the 1971 edition, held in late February to avoid the summer heat of Florida, continued to be held during that month until 2018. From 2019 it is held in May.

Tiger Woods came closest to winning a modern Grand Slam by holding all four major titles at the same time. He won all four major championships consecutively — the U.S. Open, Open Championship, and PGA Championship in 2000 and the 2001 Masters — but not in the same calendar year.  This has been called the Tiger Slam. In fact, even before Woods accomplished this, there was much debate over the definition of "Grand Slam." Fred Couples said, "I don't know how I can put it more simply . . . if he wins all four, it's a Slam." 

Only five golfers have won all four of golf's modern majors at any time during their careers, an achievement which is often referred to as a Career Grand Slam: Gene Sarazen, Ben Hogan, Gary Player, Jack Nicklaus, and Tiger Woods. Woods and Nicklaus have won each of the four majors at least three times.

The term also refers to a former tour tournament, the PGA Grand Slam of Golf, an annual off-season tournament, that was cancelled after the 2014 tournament, contested by the winners of the four major championships.

Career Grand Slam

Original Grand Slam

Modern Grand Slam

Women's golf

Women's golf also has a set of majors. No woman has completed a four-major Grand Slam, but Babe Zaharias won all three majors contested in 1950 and Sandra Haynie won both majors in 1974.

Seven women have completed the Career Grand Slam by winning four different majors. There are variations in the set of four tournaments involved as the players played in different eras, and the women's tournaments defined as "majors" have varied considerably over time in a way that has not been paralleled in the men's game. The seven are Pat Bradley, Juli Inkster, Inbee Park, Annika Sörenstam, Louise Suggs, Karrie Webb, and Mickey Wright. Webb is separately recognized by the LPGA as its only "Super Career Grand Slam" winner, as she is the only one of the group to have won five different tournaments recognized as majors.

Although other women's tours, notably the Ladies European Tour (LET) and the LPGA of Japan Tour, recognize a different set of "majors", the U.S. LPGA is so dominant in global women's golf that the phrase "women's majors", without further qualification, is almost universally considered as a reference to the U.S. LPGA majors.

The five current major championships are:
 March/April—The ANA Inspiration (week ending in the first Sunday of April)—Founded by Dinah Shore, it is most remembered for the winners taking a "lake jump" into the water surrounding the 18th green, also called the "Green Jacket of the LPGA" in reference to the ceremony held at the Masters Tournament. It shares another trait with the Masters—it is held at the same venue every year, Mission Hills Country Club in Rancho Mirage, California.
 June—The U.S. Women's Open (from 2019, ending on the first Sunday in June)—Hosted by the USGA, it is held at various golf courses around the nation.  It is considered by some to be the biggest major in the LPGA circuit, despite the fact it is not sanctioned by the Ladies European Tour.  It is held at various courses throughout the United States.
 June—The KPMG Women's PGA Championship (from 2019, three weeks after the U.S. Women's Open)—hosted by the PGA of America since 2015 and played at various locations in the USA.
 July—The Evian Championship (week ending in the last Sunday of July)—an event held in France that was historically known as the Evian Masters and became the LPGA's fifth major championship in 2013. The tournament has been an LET major since its inception in 1994, and was sanctioned as a regular LPGA tour event from 2000 to 2012.  Before 2019, it had been held in September.
 August—The AIG Women's British Open (week of the first Sunday of August)—It is hosted by The R&A, which absorbed the event's former operator, the Ladies' Golf Union, in late 2016. Unlike the men's Open Championship, neither the LGU nor The R&A has adopted a links-only course policy, although the event has most commonly been held on links courses in the 21st century. 2007 marked the first time it was held at what is considered by many to be the greatest golf course in the world, and certainly the most historic, the Old Course at St Andrews. In 2009, it was moved to a date three weeks after the U.S. Women's Open. The 2012 edition was held in September to avoid conflict with the 2012 Summer Olympics in London; in 2013, it returned to its then-current July/August date; and in 2019, it was fixed to be the week after The Evian Championship. Before 2013, this was the only championship sanctioned as a major by both the LPGA and the LET.

Women's Career Grand Slam

Super Grand Slam

Titleholders/Western Open era

du Maurier Classic era

Women's British Open Championship era

The Evian Championship Era

A Inbee Park is recognized as achieving the career Grand Slam for winning four different major championships, even though The Evian Championship had since been designated as the fifth major championship.

Senior golf
Senior (i.e., 50 and over) men's golf also has a set of majors. Like the women's majors, the senior majors are not globally recognized. However, because the U.S.-based PGA Tour Champions overwhelmingly dominates worldwide senior golf, its roster of majors is by far the most widely recognized.

Unlike the mainstream men's and women's (until 2013) Grand Slams, the senior version (as recognized by PGA Tour Champions) now contains five events.

In the current order of play, the five majors are:
 The Tradition (ending on the third or fourth Sunday in May, depending on the calendar)
 Senior PGA Championship (one week after The Tradition; ending the day before the U.S. holiday of Memorial Day, observed on the last Monday of May)
 Senior Players Championship (ending on the last Sunday in June or the first Sunday in July, depending on the calendar)
 U.S. Senior Open (ending on the Sunday in July two weeks before The Senior Open Championship)
 The Senior Open Championship (ending on the last Sunday in July)

The Senior PGA is by far the oldest of the senior majors, having been founded in 1937, decades before the establishment of PGA Tour Champions (as the Senior PGA Tour) in 1980. The other events were all founded in the 1980s—the U.S. Senior Open in 1980, the Senior Players Championship in 1983, The Senior Open in 1987, and The Tradition in 1989. This era saw senior golf became a commercial success as the first golf stars of the television era, such as Arnold Palmer and Gary Player, reached their fifties. The Senior Open, however, was not recognized as a U.S. senior major until 2003.

The stability of the majors in senior golf falls somewhere between mainstream men's golf and the LPGA:
 The roster of mainstream men's majors has not changed since the concept of the professional "Grand Slam" was generally recognized. The number of tournaments recognized by the LPGA as majors, as well as the identity of these events, has varied considerably over the decades. Two tournaments that were once considered as LPGA majors no longer exist, and a third lost its major status but survives as a regular tour event. In senior golf, the number of majors has changed over the years, but always by the addition of a new major.
 In terms of in-season scheduling, the senior majors have been much less stable than those of mainstream men's golf or the LPGA, especially in recent years. With the exception of a one-off staging of the PGA Championship in February 1971, the mainstream majors were held in the same order, and in almost exactly the same weeks of the year, from 1969 to 2018, after which the PGA Championship moved to the weekend before Memorial Day. In women's golf, the scheduling of the majors has stabilized in recent years, with occasional minor changes of dates but no change of order. However, in senior golf, the order of the majors has changed five times since 2006. The Senior Players Championship, held in July in 2006, moved to October in 2007, August in 2011, and to late June/early July in 2012. The Tradition, previously held in late August, moved to early May in 2011, mid-June in 2012, and mid-May in 2013. The U.S. Senior Open moved from mid-July to August in 2008; it returned to mid-July in 2012. The Senior PGA Championship and The Senior Open have retained their dates (respectively late May and late July) throughout this period.

No man has ever won all of the senior majors contested in a year, even in the period between 1980 and 1982 when only two senior majors existed. Bernhard Langer is the only man to have won all five of the current senior majors in his career, having completed the career Slam by winning both the Senior PGA Championship and Senior Open Championship in 2017. Miller Barber won both of the 1980-1982 senior majors, the Senior PGA and U.S. Senior Open, during that time span, and won the inaugural Senior Players Championship in 1983. Those three tournaments would be the only senior majors until The Tradition was first played in 1989. Prior to the founding of The Tradition, Palmer and Player also completed that era's Career Senior Grand Slam. However, neither Barber, Palmer, nor Player would ever win The Tradition.

Jack Nicklaus is the only other player to have completed any era's Career Senior Grand Slam, doing so in his first two years on the Senior Tour. In his first year of eligibility in 1990, he won The Tradition and the Senior Players Championship. The next year, he defended his Tradition title and went on to win the Senior PGA and U.S. Senior Open. However, he failed to defend his Senior Players title and thus missed out on a calendar-year Grand Slam.

Langer and Nicklaus are the only players to have won four or more different senior majors in their careers. Although Nicklaus never won The Senior Open, that event was not recognized as a U.S. senior major until 2003, which was also the only year he played the event. Player won The Senior Open three times before 2003, when it was considered a major by the European Senior Tour but not the circuit now known as PGA Tour Champions.

PGA Tour Champions career Grand Slam

See also
 Triple Crown (golf)
 Men's major golf championships
 Chronological list of men's major golf champions
 Women's major golf championships
 List of men's major championships winning golfers
 Chronological list of LPGA major golf champions
 List of LPGA major championship winning golfers

Notes and references

Golf terminology
Golf records and rankings
Z